Nira Burstein is an American filmmaker based in New York City. She is known for her documentary film Charm Circle. In 2021, Filmmaker magazine named her one of the "25 New Faces of Independent Film".

Career
Burstein graduated from Queens College, City University of New York. In 2014, her short film Off & Away, premiered at the Brooklyn Film Festival. In 2020, her short film Gangrenous, premiered at the Nantucket Film Festival. In 2021, she directed her debut feature documentary Charm Circle, which premiered at the Sheffield Doc/Fest.

Filmography

Awards and nominations

References

External links
 

Living people
American documentary film directors
American documentary film producers
American film directors
Queens College, City University of New York alumni
American film editors
American women film directors
Year of birth missing (living people)